Utrechtse Sportvereniging Hercules (Utrecht Sports Association Hercules), also known as USV Hercules or Hercules Utrecht, is an amateur football club in Utrecht, Netherlands. In 2014 it joined the Derde Divisie (then still known as Topklasse) after playing just one year in the Hoofdklasse, ever.

History 
In 2017, USV Hercules led 1–0 against FC Groningen in the national KNVB Cup but went on to lose the game, 1–2.

In the 2021–22 season, USV Hercules qualified for the promotion playoffs, but lost 6–3 on aggregate to DVS '33 in the first round.

References

External links
 Official site

 
Multi-sport clubs in the Netherlands
Football clubs in the Netherlands
Football clubs in Utrecht (city)
Sports clubs in Utrecht (city)
Association football clubs established in 1882
1882 establishments in the Netherlands